The 2009 Coastal Carolina Chanticleers football team represented Coastal Carolina University in the 2009 NCAA Division I FCS football season. The Chanticleers were led by seventh-year head coach David Bennett and played their home games at Brooks Stadium. Coastal Carolina competed as a member of the Big South Conference. They finished the season 5–6 with a 3–3 record in conference play.

Schedule

References

Coastal Carolina
Coastal Carolina Chanticleers football seasons
Coastal Carolina Chanticleers football